Pihlajavesi is a lake in Finland. The area of the lake is  making it the sixth largest lake in the country. Pihlajavesi is the second-largest basin in the complex Saimaa lake system. Pihlajavesi lacks large open lake areas but has more islands than any other lake in Finland.

References

External links
 

Saimaa
Nature of Savonlinna